The Piaggio P.X, or Piaggio Stella P.X, was an Italian nine-cylinder radial aircraft engine produced by Rinaldo Piaggio S.p.A. Based on experience license-producing Gnome et Rhône designs, the engine was used to power a number of aircraft during World War II, including the IMAM Ro.37bis and IMAM Ro.43, used extensively by the Regia Aeronautica and Regia Marina respectively.

Design and development
Piaggio acquired a license from Gnome et Rhône in 1925 for their engines derived from the Bristol Jupiter. The designs proved successful and, using this experience, the company designed a range of related radial engines named "Stella", meaning star. Design was led by the engineer Renzo Spolti. The engines were initially known by their number of cylinders, so the first nine-cylinder model in the range was the P.IX of 1933. However, a progressive number in Roman numerals were used as the design progressed, so the P.IX was followed by the P.X.

The Stella P.X was a nine cylinder version of the P.VII. It retained the same bore and stroke as the original Gnome-Rhône designs,  and  respectively, but was substantially more powerful than the comparable 9K. The engine had a two piece aluminium alloy crankcase and steel barrels for the cylinders and aluminium alloy heads. A Piaggio T2-80 updraught carburettor was fitted. The basic version, the R., had reduction gear, while the R.C. was also equipped with a compressor.

The engine powered Italian aircraft that served during World War II. The IMAM Ro.43 was particularly noteworthy for its performance in the Battles of Cape Spartivento and Cape Matapan.

Variants
P.X R. Normally aspirated and geared.

Applications
 IMAM Ro.37bis
 IMAM Ro.43
 IMAM Ro.44
 Savoia-Marchetti S.73
 Savoia-Marchetti S.74
 Savoia-Marchetti SM.81

Specifications (R.C.35)

See also

References

Citations

Bibliography

 
 

 
 
 

Aircraft air-cooled radial piston engines
1930s aircraft piston engines
P.X